The 2019 Bulgarian Supercup was the 16th Bulgarian Supercup, an annual Bulgarian football match played between the winners of the previous season's First Professional Football League and Bulgarian Cup. The game was played between the champions of the 2018–19 First League, Ludogorets Razgrad, and the 2019 Bulgarian Cup winners, Lokomotiv Plovdiv.

This was Ludogorets's seventh Bulgarian Supercup appearance and Lokomotiv Plovdiv's third. The two teams played each other in the 2012 Bulgarian Supercup, with Ludogorets winning 3−1.

Ludogorets won the Supercup for a 4th time after a 2–0 win over Lokomotiv Plovdiv. The goals were scored by Mavis Tchibota and Jody Lukoki.

Match overview

Match details

Post-match reactions

References

2019
Supercup
Bulgaria
PFC Ludogorets Razgrad matches
PFC Lokomotiv Plovdiv matches
Bulgarian Supercup